The 2022 NFL Draft was the 87th edition of the National Football League's annual draft and was held from April 28–30, 2022, at the Caesars Forum on the Las Vegas Strip in Paradise, Nevada. The first round was held on Thursday, April 28, and was followed by the second and third rounds on Friday, April 29. The draft concluded with rounds 4–7 on Saturday, April 30. It was the first draft to be held in the Las Vegas metropolitan area and the state of Nevada.

The first five selections were defensive players, the second-most taken at the start of a draft after the six in 1991. Along with the 1972 and 2000 drafts, it marked the third time defensive players were the first two picks after the first three picks in the previous year's draft were quarterbacks. Five Georgia defensive players were also taken during the first round, the most from an individual school in a draft.

In addition to the high number of defensive selections, nine offensive linemen were taken in the first round, the most since 2013. Conversely, only one quarterback (Kenny Pickett) was selected in the first round at 20th overall, the lowest for a draft's first quarterback since 1997, and no running backs were taken in the first round for the first time since 2014.

The draft also saw a record nine draft-day trades with first-round picks, which resulted in less than half of the first round selections being made by the teams that initially owned them. Analysts attributed the high number of trades to eight teams entering the draft without a first-round selection and a general absence of highly-touted prospects.

Host city 
The league awarded the draft to Las Vegas on April 23, 2020 after the Raiders officially relocated to Las Vegas. This was after the COVID-19 pandemic forced the 2020 NFL Draft, originally scheduled to be held in Las Vegas, to take place remotely via video conferencing.

Draft activities were held around two main locations on the Las Vegas Strip; invited players walked a red carpet stage constructed on the man-made lake in front of the Bellagio and its fountains. The plans were similar to those originally intended for the 2020 draft, although a plan for players to be transported onto the stage by boat was scrapped in favor of using walkways.

Caesars Forum was used to house infrastructure for the event. The Linq Promenade hosted the NFL Draft Experience, which featured fan activities. Parts of Flamingo Road and Las Vegas Boulevard were closed to vehicle traffic to allow spectators to travel between the two sites.

Player selections
The following is the breakdown of the 262 players selected by position:

 37 cornerbacks
 33 linebackers
 28 wide receivers
 24 offensive tackles
 22 running backs
 21 defensive ends
 19 safeties
 19 offensive guards
 19 tight ends
 19 defensive tackles
 9 quarterbacks
 6 centers
 4 punters
 1 kicker
 1 fullback

Notable undrafted players

Trades
In the explanations below, (PD) indicates trades completed prior to the start of the draft (i.e. Pre-Draft), while (D) denotes trades that took place during the 2022 draft.

Round one

Round two

Round three

Round four

Round five

Round six

Round seven

2020 Resolution JC-2A selections
Since the 2021 draft, the NFL, under 2020 Resolution JC-2A, rewards teams for developing minority candidates for head coach and/or general manager positions. The resolution rewards teams whose minority candidates are hired away for one of those positions by awarding draft selections, which are at the end of the third round, after standard compensatory selections; if multiple teams qualify, they are awarded by draft order in the first round. These picks are in addition to, and have no impact on, the standard 32 compensatory selections. Seven picks were awarded for the 2022 draft pursuant to the resolution.

Notes

Forfeited selections

Summary

Selections by NCAA conference

Colleges with multiple draft selections

Selections by position

References
Trade references

General references

National Football League Draft
Draft
NFL Draft
American football in Nevada
Events in Paradise, Nevada
NFL Draft